In 2019, four of the seven SI base units specified in the International System of Quantities were redefined in terms of natural physical constants, rather than human artifacts such as the standard kilogram. Effective 20 May 2019, the 144th anniversary of the Metre Convention, the kilogram, ampere, kelvin, and mole are now defined by setting exact numerical values, when expressed in SI units, for the Planck constant, the elementary electric charge, the Boltzmann constant, and the Avogadro constant, respectively. The second, metre, and candela had previously been redefined using physical constants. The four new definitions aimed to improve the SI without changing the value of any units, ensuring continuity with existing measurements. In November 2018, the 26th General Conference on Weights and Measures (CGPM) unanimously approved these changes, which the International Committee for Weights and Measures (CIPM) had proposed earlier that year after determining that previously agreed conditions for the change had been met. These conditions were satisfied by a series of experiments that measured the constants to high accuracy relative to the old SI definitions, and were the culmination of decades of research.

The previous major change of the metric system occurred in 1960 when the International System of Units (SI) was formally published. At this time the metre was redefined: the definition was changed from the prototype of the metre to a certain number of wavelengths of a spectral line of a krypton-86 radiation, making it derivable from universal natural phenomena. The kilogram remained defined by a physical prototype, leaving it the only artifact upon which the SI unit definitions depend. At this time the SI, as a coherent system, was constructed around seven base units, powers of which were used to construct all other units. With the 2019 redefinition, the SI is constructed around seven defining constants, allowing all units to be constructed directly from these constants. The designation of base units is retained but is no longer essential to define the SI units.

The metric system was originally conceived as a system of measurement that was derivable from unchanging phenomena, but practical limitations necessitated the use of artifacts – the prototype of the metre and prototype of the kilogram – when the metric system was introduced in France in 1799. Although it was designed for long-term stability, the masses of the prototype kilogram and its secondary copies have shown small variations relative to each other over time; they are not thought to be adequate for the increasing accuracy demanded by science, prompting a search for a suitable replacement. The definitions of some units were defined by measurements that are difficult to precisely realise in a laboratory, such as the kelvin, which was defined in terms of the triple point of water. With the 2019 redefinition, the SI became wholly derivable from natural phenomena with most units being based on fundamental physical constants.

A number of authors have published criticisms of the revised definitions; their criticisms include the premise that the proposal failed to address the impact of breaking the link between the definition of the dalton and the definitions of the kilogram, the mole, and the Avogadro constant.

Background

The basic structure of the SI was developed over about 170 years between 1791 and 1960. Since 1960, technological advances have made it possible to address weaknesses in the SI such as the dependence on a physical artifact to define the kilogram.

Development of SI
During the early years of the French Revolution, the leaders of the French National Constituent Assembly decided to introduce a new system of measurement that was based on the principles of logic and natural phenomena. The metre was defined as one ten-millionth of the distance from the north pole to the equator and the kilogram as the mass of one thousandth of a cubic metre of pure water. Although these definitions were chosen to avoid ownership of the units, they could not be measured with sufficient convenience or precision to be of practical use.

By 1875, use of the metric system had become widespread in Europe and in Latin America; that year, twenty industrially developed nations met for the Convention of the Metre, which led to the signing of the Treaty of the Metre, under which three bodies were set up to take custody of the international prototypes of the kilogram and the metre, and to regulate comparisons with national prototypes. They were:
 CGPM (General Conference on Weights and Measures) – The Conference meets every four to six years and consists of delegates of the nations that had signed the convention. It discusses and examines the arrangements required to ensure the propagation and improvement of the International System of Units and it endorses the results of new fundamental metrological determinations.
 CIPM (International Committee for Weights and Measures) – The Committee consists of eighteen eminent scientists, each from a different country, nominated by the CGPM. The CIPM meets annually and is tasked with advising the CGPM. The CIPM has set up a number of sub-committees, each charged with a particular area of interest. One of these, the Consultative Committee for Units (CCU), advises the CIPM on matters concerning units of measurement.
 BIPM (International Bureau for Weights and Measures) – The Bureau provides safe keeping of the international prototypes of the kilogram and the metre, provides laboratory facilities for regular comparisons of the national prototypes with the international prototype, and is the secretariat for the CIPM and the CGPM.

The 1st CGPM (1889) formally approved the use of 40 prototype metres and 40 prototype kilograms made by the British firm Johnson Matthey as the standards mandated by the Convention of the Metre. The prototypes Metre No. 6 and Kilogram KIII  were designated as the international prototype of the metre and the kilogram, respectively; the CGPM retained other copies as working copies, and the rest were distributed to member states for use as their national prototypes. About once every 40 years, the national prototypes were compared with and recalibrated against the international prototype.

In 1921 the Convention of the Metre was revised and the mandate of the CGPM was extended to provide standards for all units of measure, not just mass and length. In the ensuing years, the CGPM took on responsibility for providing standards of electrical current (1946), luminosity (1946), temperature (1948), time (1956), and molar mass (1971). The 9th CGPM in 1948 instructed the CIPM "to make recommendations for a single practical system of units of measurement, suitable for adoption by all countries adhering to the Metre Convention". The recommendations based on this mandate were presented to the 11th CGPM (1960), where they were formally accepted and given the name "" and its abbreviation "SI".

Impetus for change
There is a precedent for changing the underlying principles behind the definition of the SI base units; the 11th CGPM (1960) defined the SI metre in terms of the wavelength of krypton-86 radiation, replacing the pre-SI metre bar, and the 13th CGPM (1967) replaced the original definition of the second, which was based on Earth's average rotation from 1750 to 1892, with a definition based on the frequency of the radiation emitted or absorbed with a transition between two hyperfine levels of the ground state of the caesium-133 atom. The 17th CGPM (1983) replaced the 1960 definition of the metre with one based on the second by giving an exact definition of the speed of light in units of metres per second.

Since their manufacture, drifts of up to  kilograms (20 μg) per year in the national prototype kilograms relative to the international prototype of the kilogram (IPK) have been detected. There was no way of determining whether the national prototypes were gaining mass or whether the IPK was losing mass. Newcastle University metrologist Peter Cumpson has since identified mercury vapour absorption or carbonaceous contamination as possible causes of this drift. At the 21st meeting of the CGPM (1999), national laboratories were urged to investigate ways of breaking the link between the kilogram and a specific artifact.

Metrologists investigated several alternative approaches to redefining the kilogram based on fundamental physical constants. Among others, the Avogadro project and the development of the Kibble balance (known as the "watt balance" before 2016) promised methods of indirectly measuring mass with very high precision. These projects provided tools that enable alternative means of redefining the kilogram.

A report published in 2007 by the Consultative Committee for Thermometry (CCT) to the CIPM noted that their current definition of temperature has proved to be unsatisfactory for temperatures below  and for temperatures above . The committee took the view that the Boltzmann constant provided a better basis for temperature measurement than did the triple point of water because it overcame these difficulties.

At its 23rd meeting (2007), the CGPM mandated the CIPM to investigate the use of natural constants as the basis for all units of measure rather than the artifacts that were then in use. The following year this was endorsed by the International Union of Pure and Applied Physics (IUPAP). At a meeting of the CCU held in Reading, United Kingdom, in September 2010, a resolution and draft changes to the SI brochure that were to be presented to the next meeting of the CIPM in October 2010 were agreed to in principle. The CIPM meeting of October 2010 found "the conditions set by the General Conference at its 23rd meeting have not yet been fully met. For this reason the CIPM does not propose a revision of the SI at the present time". The CIPM, however, presented a resolution for consideration at the 24th CGPM (17–21 October 2011) to agree to the new definitions in principle, but not to implement them until the details had been finalised. This resolution was accepted by the conference, and in addition the CGPM moved the date of the 25th meeting forward from 2015 to 2014. At the 25th meeting on 18 to 20 November 2014, it was found that "despite [progress in the necessary requirements] the data do not yet appear to be sufficiently robust for the CGPM to adopt the revised SI at its 25th meeting", thus postponing the revision to the next meeting in 2018. Measurements accurate enough to meet the conditions were available in 2017 and the redefinition was adopted at the 26th CGPM (13–16 November 2018).

Redefinition
 Following the successful 1983 redefinition of the metre in terms of an exact numerical value for the speed of light, the BIPM's Consultative Committee for Units (CCU) recommended and the BIPM proposed that four further constants of nature should be defined to have exact values. These are
 The Planck constant  is exactly .
 The elementary charge  is exactly .
 The Boltzmann constant  is exactly .
 The Avogadro constant  is exactly .
These constants are described in the 2006 version of the SI manual but in that version, the latter three are defined as "constants to be obtained by experiment" rather than as "defining constants". 
The redefinition retains unchanged the numerical values associated with the following constants of nature:

 The speed of light  is exactly ;
 The ground state hyperfine structure transition frequency of the caesium-133 atom  is exactly ;
 The luminous efficacy  of monochromatic radiation of frequency  – a frequency of green-colored light at approximately the peak sensitivity of the human eye – is exactly .

The seven definitions above are rewritten below with the derived units (joule, coulomb, hertz, lumen, and watt) expressed in terms of the seven base units: second, metre, kilogram, ampere, kelvin, mole, and candela, according to the 9th SI Brochure. In the list that follows, the symbol sr stands for the dimensionless unit steradian.

  =  = 
  = 
  = 
  = 
  = 
  = 
  = 

As part of the redefinition, the International Prototype of the Kilogram was retired and definitions of the kilogram, the ampere, and the kelvin were replaced. The definition of the mole was revised. These changes have the effect of redefining the SI base units, though the definitions of the SI derived units in terms of the base units remain the same.

Impact on base unit definitions
Following the CCU proposal, the texts of the definitions of all of the base units were either refined or rewritten, changing the emphasis from explicit-unit- to explicit-constant-type definitions. Explicit-unit-type definitions define a unit in terms of a specific example of that unit; for example, in 1324 Edward II defined the inch as being the length of three barleycorns, and from 1889 to 2019 the kilogram was defined as the mass of the International Prototype of the Kilogram. In explicit-constant definitions, a constant of nature is given a specified value, and the definition of the unit emerges as a consequence; for example, in 2019, the speed of light was defined as exactly  metres per second. The length of the metre could be derived because the second had been already independently defined. The previous and 2019 definitions are given below.

Second
The new definition of the second is effectively the same as the previous one, the only difference being that the conditions under which the definition applies are more rigorously defined.
Previous definition: The second is the duration of  periods of the radiation corresponding to the transition between the two hyperfine levels of the ground state of the caesium-133 atom. 
2019 definition: The second, symbol s, is the SI unit of time. It is defined by taking the fixed numerical value of the caesium frequency, the unperturbed ground-state hyperfine transition frequency of the caesium-133 atom, to be  when expressed in the unit Hz, which is equal to s−1.
The second may be expressed directly in terms of the defining constants:
 1 s = .

Metre
The new definition of the metre is effectively the same as the previous one, the only difference being that the additional rigour in the definition of the second propagated to the metre.
2019 definition: The metre, symbol m, is the SI unit of length. It is defined by taking the fixed numerical value of the speed of light in vacuum  to be  when expressed in the unit m⋅s−1, where the second is defined in terms of the caesium frequency .
The metre may be expressed directly in terms of the defining constants:
 1 m = .

Kilogram

The definition of the kilogram changed fundamentally; the previous definition defined the kilogram as the mass of the International Prototype of the Kilogram, which is an artifact rather than a constant of nature. The new definition relates the kilogram to, amongst things, the equivalent mass of the energy of a photon given its frequency, via the Planck constant.
Previous definition: The kilogram is the unit of mass; it is equal to the mass of the international prototype of the kilogram.
2019 definition: The kilogram, symbol kg, is the SI unit of mass.

For illustration, an earlier proposed redefinition that is equivalent to this 2019 definition is: "The kilogram is the mass of a body at rest whose equivalent energy equals the energy of a collection of photons whose frequencies sum to [] hertz."

The kilogram may be expressed directly in terms of the defining constants:
 1 kg = .

Leading to
 1 J⋅s = 

 1 J = 

1 W = 

1 N =

Ampere
The definition of the ampere underwent a major revision. The previous definition, which is difficult to realise with high precision in practice, was replaced by a definition that is easier to realise.
Previous definition: The ampere is that constant current which, if maintained in two straight parallel conductors of infinite length, of negligible circular cross-section, and placed 1 m apart in vacuum, would produce between these conductors a force equal to  newton per metre of length.
2019 definition: The ampere, symbol A, is the SI unit of electric current.

The ampere may be expressed directly in terms of the defining constants as:
 1 A = 

For illustration, this is equivalent to defining one coulomb to be an exact specified multiple of the elementary charge.
 1 C = 

Because the previous definition contains a reference to force, which has the dimensions MLT−2, it follows that in the previous SI the kilogram, metre, and second – the base units representing these dimensions – had to be defined before the ampere could be defined. Other consequences of the previous definition were that in SI the value of vacuum permeability was fixed at exactly . Because the speed of light in vacuum is also fixed, it followed from the relationship

that the vacuum permittivity had a fixed value, and from

that the impedance of free space likewise had a fixed value.

A consequence of the revised definition is that the ampere no longer depends on the definitions of the kilogram and the metre; it does, however, still depend on the definition of the second. In addition, the numerical values when expressed in SI units of the vacuum permeability, vacuum permittivity, and impedance of free space, which were exact before the redefinition, are subject to experimental error after the redefinition. For example, the numerical value of the vacuum permeability has a relative uncertainty equal to that of the experimental value of the fine-structure constant .

The ampere definition leads to exact values for

1 V = 

1 Wb = 

1 Ω =

Kelvin
The definition of the kelvin underwent a fundamental change. Rather than using the triple point of water to fix the temperature scale, the new definition uses the energy equivalent as given by Boltzmann's equation.
2019 definition: The kelvin, symbol K, is the SI unit of thermodynamic temperature.

The kelvin may be expressed directly in terms of the defining constants as:
 1 K = .

Mole

The previous definition of the mole linked it to the kilogram. The revised definition breaks that link by making a mole a specific number of entities of the substance in question.
Previous definition: The mole is the amount of substance of a system that contains as many elementary entities as there are atoms in 0.012 kilogram of carbon-12. When the mole is used, the elementary entities must be specified and may be atoms, molecules, ions, electrons, other particles, or specified groups of such particles.
2019 definition: The mole, symbol mol, is the SI unit of amount of substance. One mole contains exactly  elementary entities. This number is the fixed numerical value of the Avogadro constant, when expressed in the unit mol−1 and is called the Avogadro number. The amount of substance, symbol , of a system is a measure of the number of specified elementary entities. An elementary entity may be an atom, a molecule, an ion, an electron, any other particle or specified group of particles.

The mole may be expressed directly in terms of the defining constants as:
 1 mol = .

One consequence of this change is that the previously defined relationship between the mass of the 12C atom, the dalton, the kilogram, and the Avogadro constant is no longer valid. One of the following had to change:
 The mass of a 12C atom is exactly 12 dalton.
 The number of dalton in a gram is exactly the numerical value of the Avogadro constant: (i.e.).

The wording of the 9th SI Brochure implies that the first statement remains valid, which means the second is no longer true. The molar mass constant, while still with great accuracy remaining , is no longer exactly equal to that.

Candela
The new definition of the candela is effectively the same as the previous definition as dependent on other base units, with the result that the redefinition of the kilogram and the additional rigour in the definitions of the second and metre propagate to the candela.
Previous definition: The candela is the luminous intensity, in a given direction, of a source that emits monochromatic radiation of frequency  and that has a radiant intensity in that direction of  watt per steradian.
2019 definition: The candela, symbol cd, is the SI unit of luminous intensity in a given direction.
1 cd =

Impact on reproducibility
All seven of the SI base units will be defined in terms of defined constants and universal physical constants. Seven constants are needed to define the seven base units but there is not a direct correspondence between each specific base unit and a specific constant; except the second and the mole, more than one of the seven constants contributes to the definition of any given base unit.

When the New SI was first designed, there were more than six suitable physical constants from which the designers could choose. For example, once length and time had been established, the universal gravitational constant G could, from a dimensional point of view, be used to define mass. In practice, G can only be measured with a relative uncertainty of the order of 10−5, which would have resulted in the upper limit of the kilogram's reproducibility being around 10−5 whereas the then-current international prototype of the kilogram can be measured with a reproducibility of 1.2 × 10−8. The physical constants were chosen on the basis of minimal uncertainty associated with measuring the constant and the degree of independence of the constant in respect of other constants that were being used. Although the BIPM has developed a standard mise en pratique (practical technique) for each type of measurement, the mise en pratique used to make the measurement is not part of the measurement's definition – it is merely an assurance that the measurement can be done without exceeding the specified maximum uncertainty.

Acceptance

Much of the work done by the CIPM is delegated to consultative committees. The CIPM Consultative Committee for Units (CCU) has made the proposed changes while other committees have examined the proposal in detail and have made recommendations regarding their acceptance by the CGPM in 2014. The consultative committees have laid down a number of criteria that must be met before they will support the CCU's proposal, including:
Both the Kibble balance and the Avogadro project should be included in the experiments and any differences between these must be reconciled.
 For the redefinition of the kelvin, the relative uncertainty of the Boltzmann constant derived from two fundamentally different methods such as acoustic gas thermometry and dielectric constant gas thermometry must be better than 10−6, and these values must be corroborated by other measurements.

As of the 2014 CODATA-recommended values of the fundamental physical constants published in 2016 using data collected until the end of 2014, all measurements met the CGPM's requirements, and the redefinition and the next CGPM quadrennial meeting in late 2018 could now proceed.

On 20 October 2017, the 106th meeting of the International Committee for Weights and Measures (CIPM) formally accepted a revised Draft Resolution A, calling for the redefinition of the SI, to be voted on at the 26th CGPM, The same day, in response to the CIPM's endorsement of the final values, the CODATA Task Group on Fundamental Constants published its 2017 recommended values for the four constants with uncertainties and proposed numerical values for the redefinition without uncertainty. The vote, which was held on 16 November 2018 at the 26th GCPM, was unanimous; all attending national representatives voted in favour of the revised proposal.

The new definitions became effective on 20 May 2019.

Concerns

In 2010, Marcus Foster of the Commonwealth Scientific and Industrial Research Organisation (CSIRO) published a wide-ranging critique of the SI; he raised numerous issues ranging from basic issues such as the absence of the symbol "Ω" (Omega, for the ohm) from most Western computer keyboards to abstract issues such as inadequate formalism in the metrological concepts on which SI is based. The changes proposed in the new SI only addressed problems with the definition of the base units, including new definitions of the candela and the mole – units Foster argued are not true base units. Other issues raised by Foster fell outside the scope of the proposal.

Explicit-unit and explicit-constant definitions
Concerns have been expressed that the use of explicit-constant definitions of the unit being defined that are not related to an example of its quantity will have many adverse effects. Although this criticism applies to the linking of the kilogram to the Planck constant  via a route that requires a knowledge of both special relativity and quantum mechanics, it does not apply to the definition of the ampere, which is closer to an example of its quantity than is the previous definition. Some observers have welcomed the change to base the definition of electric current on the charge of the electron rather than the previous definition of a force between two parallel, current-carrying wires; because the nature of the electromagnetic interaction between two bodies is somewhat different at the quantum electrodynamics level than at classical electrodynamic levels, it is considered inappropriate to use classical electrodynamics to define quantities that exist at quantum electrodynamic levels.

Mass and the Avogadro constant
When the scale of the divergence between the IPK and national kilogram prototypes was reported in 2005, a debate began about whether the kilogram should be defined in terms of the mass of the silicon-28 atom or by using the Kibble balance. The mass of a silicon atom could be determined using the Avogadro project and using the Avogadro constant, it could be linked directly to the kilogram. Concerns that the authors of the proposal had failed to address the impact of breaking the link between the mole, kilogram, dalton, and the Avogadro constant have also been expressed. This direct link has caused many to argue that the mole is not a true physical unit but, according to the Swedish philosopher Johansson, a "scaling factor".

The 8th edition of the SI Brochure defines the dalton in terms of the mass of an atom of 12C. It defines the Avogadro constant in terms of this mass and the kilogram, making it determined by experiment. The proposal fixes the Avogadro constant and the 9th SI Brochure retains the definition of dalton in terms of 12C, with the effect that the link between the dalton and the kilogram will be broken.

In 1993, the International Union of Pure and Applied Chemistry (IUPAC) approved the use of the dalton as an alternative to the unified atomic mass unit with the qualification that the CGPM had not given its approval. This approval has since been given. Following the proposal to redefine the mole by fixing the value of the Avogadro constant, Brian Leonard of the University of Akron, writing in Metrologia, proposed that the dalton (Da) be redefined such that , but that the unified atomic mass unit retain its current definition based on the mass of 12C, ceasing to exactly equal the dalton. This would result in the dalton and the atomic mass unit potentially differing from each other with a relative uncertainty of the order of 10−10. The 9th SI Brochure, however, defines both the dalton (Da) and the unified atomic mass unit (u) as exactly  of the mass of a free carbon-12 atom and not in relation to the kilogram, with the effect that the above equation will be inexact.

Temperature

Different temperature ranges need different measurement methods. Room temperature can be measured by means of expansion and contraction of a liquid in a thermometer but high temperatures are often associated with colour of blackbody radiation. Wojciech T. Chyla, approaching the structure of SI from a philosophical point of view in the Journal of the Polish Physical Society, argued that temperature is not a real base unit but is an average of the thermal energies of the individual particles that comprise the body concerned. Chyla acknowledged, however, that in the macroscopic world, temperature plays the role of a base unit because much of the theory of thermodynamics is based on temperature.

The Consultative Committee for Thermometry, part of the International Committee for Weights and Measures, publishes a mise en pratique (practical technique), last updated in 1990, for measuring temperature. At very low and at very high temperatures it often links energy to temperature via the Boltzmann constant.

Luminous intensity
Foster argued that "luminous intensity [the candela] is not a physical quantity, but a photobiological quantity that exists in human perception", questioning whether the candela should be a base unit. Before the 1979 decision to define photometric units in terms of luminous flux (power) rather than luminous intensities of standard light sources, there was already doubt whether there should still be a separate base unit for photometry. Furthermore, there was unanimous agreement that the lumen was now more fundamental than the candela. However, for the sake of continuity the candela was kept as base unit.

See also
 
 
 
 
 
  – changes associated with the 2019 redefinition

Notes

References

Further reading

External links
 BIPM website on the New SI, including a FAQ page.
 A Turning Point for Humanity: Redefining the World’s Measurement System by NIST
 Measuring Mass: The Last Artefact - BBC Four

SI units
2018 in science
2019 in science
Definitions